Jawaharlal Nehru Stadium may refer to several sports stadiums in India:

 Jawaharlal Nehru Stadium, Goa, also known as Fatorda Stadium, multi-use
 Jawaharlal Nehru Stadium, Delhi
 Jawaharlal Nehru Stadium, Coimbatore, multi-purpose
 Jawaharlal Nehru Stadium, Ghaziabad, multi-purpose
 Jawaharlal Nehru Stadium, Chennai, multi-use football and athletics
 Jawaharlal Nehru Stadium, Kochi, football (soccer) and cricket
 Jawaharlal Nehru Stadium, Shillong, multi-use football and polo
 Jawaharlal Nehru Stadium, Tiruchirappalli, cricket
 Jawaharlal Nehru University Stadium, multi-purpose university sports complex in Delhi
 Nehru Stadium, Guwahati, multi-purpose
 Nehru Stadium, Indore, cricket
 Nehru Stadium, Kottayam, multi-use football and athletics
 Nehru Stadium, Pune, multi-purpose
 Nehru Stadium, Durgapur, multi-purpose
 Nehru Stadium, Tumkur, multi-purpose
 Nehru Stadium, Hubli, multi-purpose
 Nehru Stadium, Shimoga, multi-purpose
 Nehru Stadium, Gurgaon, multi-purpose